is a Japanese professional footballer who plays as an attacking midfielder or a winger for Ligue 1 club Strasbourg, on loan from Shimizu S-Pulse.

Career
After graduation at Funabashi Municipal High School in 2019, Yuito begin first professional career with Shimizu S-Pulse from 2020 season.

On 28 January 2023, Yuito moved abroad to France and officially joined Ligue 1 club RC Strasbourg Alsace on loan for 2022–23 season.

Career statistics

Club
.

References

External links
Profile at Shimizu S-Pulse

2001 births
Living people
Japanese footballers
Japan youth international footballers
Association football midfielders
J1 League players
Ligue 1 players
Shimizu S-Pulse players
RC Strasbourg Alsace players
Japanese expatriate footballers
Expatriate footballers in France
Japanese expatriate sportspeople in France